Gorenja Dobrava is a settlement south of Gorenja Vas in the Municipality of Gorenja Vas–Poljane in the Upper Carniola region of Slovenia.

Name
The name Gorenja Dobrava means 'upper Dobrava', contrasting with neighboring Dolenja Dobrava (literally, 'lower Dobrava'), which stands about  lower. Gorenja Dobrava was attested in historical sources as Hard Superiori in 1291, Superiori Hard in 1318, Dobraw in 1420, and Gorenidobraui in 1500. The place name Dobrava is relatively frequent in Slovenia. It is derived from the Slovene common noun dobrava 'gently rolling partially wooded land' (and archaically 'woods, grove'). The name therefore refers to the local geography.

Church

The local church is dedicated to Saint Urban. The oldest part of the church dates to the early 16th century, but it was later extended and the Baroque belfry was added. A fresco of Saint Christopher is preserved on its exterior wall.

References

External links 

Gorenja Dobrava on Geopedia

Populated places in the Municipality of Gorenja vas-Poljane